Rheeya Doshi (born 24 April 1996) is a female former tennis player Singapore.

Playing for Singapore Fed Cup team, she has a win/loss record of 4–7.

Doshi will be attending Northwestern University in fall 2014, having signed with the Wildcats tennis team just one year prior.

Representing Northwestern, Doshi holds a win/loss record of 63–52 in singles and 80–44 in doubles.

Fed Cup participation

Singles

Doubles

References

External links
 
 
 

1996 births
Living people
Singaporean sportspeople of Indian descent
Northwestern Wildcats women's tennis players
Singaporean expatriates in the United States
Singaporean female tennis players